Pangong Tso or Pangong Lake is an endorheic lake spanning eastern Ladakh and West Tibet situated at an elevation of . Approximately 50% of the length of the overall lake lies within Tibet in China, 40% in Ladakh, India and the remaining 10% is disputed and is a de facto buffer zone between India and China. All together it covers almost 700 km2. During winter the lake freezes completely, despite being saline water. It has a land-locked basin separated from the Indus River basin by a small elevated ridge, but is believed to have been part of the latter in prehistoric times.

Names 
Historically, the lake is viewed as being made up five sublakes, which are connected through narrow water channels. The name Pangong Tso only applied to the westernmost lake that is mostly in Ladakh. The main lake on the Tibetan side is called Tso Nyak (the "middle lake"). It is followed by two small lakes called Rum Tso. The last lake near Rutog is called Nyak Tso again. The whole lake group was and is still often referred to as Tsomo Nganglha Ringpo in Tibetan.

There are different interpretations of the meanings of both Pangong Tso and Tsomo Nganglha Ringpo. The Ladakh government website says "Pangong Tso" is Tibetan, meaning "high grassland lake", however travel books say Pangong means "hollow". Tsomo Nganglha Ringpo is Tibetan that is interpreted to mean various different but similar meanings -- "long, narrow, enchanted lake" by Chinese media sources, "female narrow very long lake" by early European explorers, and "long-necked swan lake" by other modern sources.

Geography

Sino-Indian border dispute 

Pangong Tso is disputed territory. The Line of Actual Control (LAC) passes through the lake. A section of the lake approximately 20 km east from the LAC is controlled by China but claimed by India. The eastern end of the lake is in Tibet. After the mid-19th century, Pangong Tso was at the southern end of Johnson Line, an early attempt at demarcation between India and China in the Aksai Chin region.

The Khurnak Fort lies on the northern bank of the lake, about halfway up Pangong Tso. The Chinese have controlled the Khurnak Fort area since 1958. To the south is the smaller Spanggur Tso lake.

On 20 October 1962, Pangong Tso saw military action during the Sino-Indian War, successful for the Chinese People's Liberation Army (PLA). The area remains a sensitive border point along the LAC. Incursions from the Chinese side are common.

In August 2017, Indian and Chinese forces near Pangong Tso engaged in a melee involving kicking, punching, rock throwing, and use of makeshift weapons such as sticks and rods.
On 11 September 2019, PLA troops confronted Indian troops on the northern bank.
On 5–6 May 2020, a face-off between about 250 Indian and Chinese troops near the lake resulted in casualties on both sides.

On 29–30 August 2020, Indian troops occupied many heights on the south bank of Pangong Tso. The heights included Rezang La, Reqin La, Black Top, Hanan, Helmet, Gurung Hill, Gorkha Hill and Magar Hill. Some of these heights are in the grey zone of the LAC and overlook Chinese camps.
India chose to pull back from these positions as leverage for larger disengagement.

China is building a bridge across the lake.
Both the Chinese and Indian militaries have vessels stationed on the lake.

Tourism 

On the Indian side, an Inner Line Permit is required to visit the lake, as it lies on the Sino-Indian Line of Actual Control. For security reasons, India does not permit boating. Groups are permitted, accompanied by an accredited guide.

China National Highway 219 passes by the eastern end of Pangong Tso. The lake can be accessed by driving 12 km from Rutog or 130 km from Shiquanhe. Tourists can rent a boat on the lake, but landing on islands is not allowed, to protecting the avian breeding grounds. There are several restaurants along the shore.

Flora and fauna 
The eastern part of the lake is fresh, with the content of total dissolved solids at 0.68 g/L, while the western part of the lake is saline, with the salinity at 11.02 g/L. The brackish water of the lake has very low micro-vegetation. Guides report that there are no fish or other aquatic life on the Indian side of the lake, except for some small crustaceans. On the other hand, visitors see numerous ducks and gulls over and on the lake surface. There are some species of scrub and perennial herbs that grow in the marshes around the lake.

The lake acts as an important breeding ground for a variety of birds including a number of migratory birds. During summer, the bar-headed geese and Brahmini ducks are commonly seen here. The region around the lake supports a number of species of wildlife including the kiang and the marmot. The lake hosts large quantities of fish, especially Schizopygopsis stoliczkai and Racoma labiata. Freshwater snails of the genus Radix also live in the lake.

Formerly, Pangong Tso had an outlet to the Shyok River, a tributary of the Indus River, but it was closed off by natural damming. Two streams feed the lake from the Indian side, forming marshes and wetlands at the edges. On the Indian side, no fish have been observed, however in the stream coming from the south-eastern side (Cheshul nalla), three fish species (Schizopygopsis stoliczkae, Tibetan stone loach and Triplophysa gracilis) have been reported (Bhat et al., 2011). The low biodiversity has been reported as being due to high salinity and harsh environmental conditions (Bhat et al., 2011).

Bird Islet is a popular location for bird-watching for tourists in Ngari.

Climate

Gallery

Maps

See also 
Aksai Chin and its locations
Sirijap
Rudok
National Large Solar Telescope
Spanggur Tso

References
Notes

Citations

Bibliography

Further reading 

 
 
 SINO-INDIAN BORDER DEFENSES CHUSHUL AREA (CIA, 1963)

Lakes of Ladakh
Lakes of Tibet
China–India border
International lakes of Asia
Tourism in Ladakh
Geography of Ladakh
Pangong Lake
Rutog County
Ngari Prefecture